MSNBC Documentaries is the umbrella title of a series of documentaries co-produced by NBC News and MSNBC.

Broadcast on MSNBC, each documentary is given its own title to broadcast under (e.g., Lockup: Return to Pelican Bay) or has been produced under one of the titles below.

Compared to competing networks, MSNBC airs documentaries on a daily basis and on weekend afternoons and evenings.

In 2012 and 2013, and again in 2016, weekend airtime for MSNBC Documentaries was reduced to make room for newer weekend political news talk shows, relegating documentary series to weekend evenings.

In 2020, NBC News Studios revived MSNBC Films as a unit for feature-length documentaries.

Program titles

Distributed under MSNBC Documentaries
 Headliners and Legends
 MSNBC Reports
 MSNBC Investigates
 Crime & Punishment
 Lockup
 To Catch a Predator
 Warrior Nation
 Hooked (Tattoos Head to Toe and Muscle Women)
 Caught on Camera
 The Assassination of Dr. Tiller
 Hubris: Selling the Iraq War
 Why We Did It

Distributed under MSNBC Films
 The Way I See It (2020)
 In the Dark of the Valley (2021)
 Four Seasons Total (2021)
 Paper & Glue (2021)
 Memory Box: Echoes of 9/11 (2021)
 Love & The Constitution (2022)
 Diamond Hands: The Legend of WallStreetBets (2022)
 The Turning Point (2022)

Hosts
The program has multiple hosts, including Ann Curry, Lester Holt, Matt Lauer, and Stone Phillips; it does not have a single consistent host, and certain episodes only have a voice-over throughout.

References 

 MSNBC Live Stream

External links

Documentaries
American documentary television series
English-language television shows